is a chain of hotels headquartered in Tennōji-ku, Osaka, Japan. It is a subsidiary of Kintetsu Group Holdings. As of today, it has 21 properties (opened or announced), including 19 in Japan, 2 in the United States.

History
Miyako Hotels began life in 1890, as a tea house and Japanese-style garden in Kyoto, which was built by a wealthy merchant named Nihei Nishimura. Nishimura then opened the first Miyako Hotel ten years later in 1900.

In July 1998, Kintetsu Hotel Systems was established as a hotel management company. 

In March 2000, a merger with the Kintetsu Hotel Systems resulted in Miyako Hotels taking over the management of the 1890-vintage hotel in Kyoto, which was rebranded as "The Westin Miyako Kyoto".

In April 2007, Starwood acquired the operating rights of the hotels in Osaka and Tokyo.

In March 2014, Miyako Hotels opened Osaka Marriot Miyako hotel in partnership with Marriott Hotels & Resorts.

On April 1, 2015, Kintetsu Corporation, the parent company of Miyako Hotels, was restructured into a holding company, splitting its railway, real estate, logistics and retail, and recreation service divisions. Miyako Hotels also changed the legal name to Kintetsu Miyako Hotels Co., Ltd. on the same day.

Brands
In August 2018, the company announced its new brands and logos. These brands divided into three categories, Miyako Hotels, Miyako City (Hotels) and Miyako Resorts which will take place on April 1, 2019.

Group hotels

Japan

Miyako Hotels
Miyako Hotels is the brand name for the most luxurious hotels by the company.
Kantō
Tokyo
 Sheraton Miyako Hotel Tokyo (Minato)
Chūbu
Gifu Prefecture
 Miyako Hotel Gifu Nagaragawa (Gifu)
Kansai
 Hyōgo Prefecture
 Miyako Hotel Amagasaki (Amagasaki)
 Kyoto Prefecture
 Miyako Hotel Kyoto Hachijō (Kyoto)
 The Westin Miyako Kyoto (Kyoto)
 Osaka Prefecture
 Sheraton Miyako Hotel Osaka (Osaka)
 Osaka Marriott Miyako hotel (Osaka)
 Mie Prefecture
 Miyako Hotel Yokkaichi (Yokkaichi)
Kyūshū
 Fukuoka Prefecture
 Miyako Hotel Hakata (Fukuoka)

Miyako City
Miyako City is the brand name for city hotels.
Kantō
Tokyo
 Miyako City Tokyo Takanawa (Minato)
Kansai
 Kyoto Prefecture
 Miyako City Kintetsu Kyoto Station (Kyoto)
 Osaka Prefecture
 Miyako City Osaka Tennōji (Osaka)
 Miyako City Osaka Hommachi (Osaka) (Scheduled to open in Spring 2020)
 Mie Prefecture
 Miyako City Tsu (Tsu)

Miyako Resorts
Miyako Resorts is the brand name for resort hotels.
Kansai
 Mie Prefecture
 Shima Kanko Hotel The Classic (Shima)
 Shima Kanko Hotel The Bay Suite (Shima)
 Shima Kanko Hotel The Club (Shima)
 Miyako Resort Shima Bay Terrace (Shima)
 Miyako Resort Okushima Aqua Forest (Shima)

Others
Hotel Kintetsu Universal City (Osaka)
Hotel Shima Spain Village (Shima)
Kashikojima Hōseikan (ryokan): (Shima)
Nara Manyō no Yado Mikasa  (ryokan): (Nara)

Overseas
Los Angeles Miyako Hotel: Los Angeles
Miyako Hybrid Hotel Torrance California: Torrance, California

Gallery

See also 
 Kintetsu Group Holdings

References

External links

Companies based in Osaka Prefecture
Hospitality companies of Japan
Hotel chains in Japan
Japanese brands
Kintetsu Group Holdings